Kolektiv Narobov is a performing arts collective from Ljubljana, Slovenia. In their very beginnings, the members of the collective have been trained in the North American style of theatre improvisation, influenced by some of its most notable practitioners, such as Keith Johnstone, Del Close, Ruth Zaporah, Randy Dixon, and others. However, ever since they have been developing their unique approach to improvisation, combining theatre improvisation techniques with the influences of physical theatre, contemporary dance and clowning. Kolektiv Narobov has made significant steps in applying the principles of spontaneous composition and live interaction with the audience, as done in theatre improvisation, into various other styles and media. These range from experimental theatre, clown and cabaret pieces to site-specific performances and radio plays, all the way to film.

Since the founding of the collective in 2004, Kolektiv Narobov has reached international acclaim, touring, guest-performing and teaching all across Europe, Canada and the United States.

In 2013, Kolektiv Narobov has joined Zavod Federacija Ljubljana, a big network of Slovenian artists who offer each other organisational, artistic and production support.

Projects

Theatre, Film, Book 
Should I Stay or Should I Go?, 2013-2015

Performances 
 Meta impro, 2011
 FM, 2011
 Le Grand Big Tour (with cheese), 2010
 Zaprto-odprto / Closed-open, 2010
 Šov dveh vdov / The Two Widows Show, 2009
 Tok-tok!, 2008 
 De.Kons, 2007
 Klic / Call, 2006
 Kjer ga najdeš / Where you find it, 2006
 Lutkovni kabare / Puppet Cabaret, 2005
 Pozor, delo na odru! / Caution! Stage under Construction, 2005
 Fantastični kabare / Fantastic Cabaret, 2005
 Pssst! / Hush!, 2004
 Ta Kratke / Shorties, 2004
 France P. / France P., 2004
 Improvizija / Improvision, 2002-2011, each year an evening before the Eurovision Song Contest

Interventions 
 Velika Sestra / Big Sister, 2007
 Nokturno / Nocturne, 2004
 Zvoki mesta / Sounds of the City, 2004

Festival 
 Goli oder /  Naked Stage (since 2002)

Awards 
Kolektiv Narobov have received awards for creative achievements in radio and television (Ježek Award in 2007) and for best experimental theatre improvisation performance (First Prize at Impronale 2007 and Impronale 2010).

External links
 Kolektiv Narobov
 Should I Stay or Should I Go?
 Goli oder / Naked Stage, International festival of improvisational theatre
 Zavod Federacija Ljubljana

Improvisational theatre
Theatre in Slovenia